"" ("She is dear to me, the precious maid") is a Lutheran hymn by Martin Luther, first published in the Klugsches Gesangbuch (Klug hymnal).

See also 

 List of hymns by Martin Luther

Literature 
 Wilhelm Lucke: Sie ist mir lieb die werte Magd. In: D. Martin Luthers Werke. Kritische Gesamtausgabe, vol. 35, Weimar 1923, pp. 254–257
 Kurt Aland (ed.), Luther Deutsch, 2nd edition. 1966, vol. 6, pp 284f. and 361

16th-century hymns in German
Hymn tunes
Hymns by Martin Luther
1535 works
Works based on the New Testament